Sing Totavee  is a Thai retired football defender who played for Thailand in the 1996 Asian Cup. He also played for Thai Farmers Bank

External links

11v11.com

1969 births
Living people
Sing Totavee
Place of birth missing (living people)
Association football defenders
Sing Totavee
Sing Totavee